Founded in 1985, the International Food Information Council (IFIC) is a nonprofit organization supported by the food, beverage, and agricultural industries.

According to the Center for Media and Democracy, "In reality, IFIC is a public relations arm of the food, beverage and agricultural industries, which provide the bulk of its funding." The vast majority of organizational revenues are generated by membership fees.  The members of the IFIC consists of companies with food and food related sales, companies such as packaging or equipment suppliers, service providers, design firms, inspection/testing organization, and canning/bottling companies, with an interest in nutrition and food safety issues, and non-industry organizations, such as research institutions, foundations, and Associations, with an interest in nutrition and food safety issues. [...]" 2018 Form 990.

Criticism 

In a report titled,  The Best Public Relations Money Can Buy: A Guide to Food Industry Front Groups, the Center for Food Safety called IFIC and similar organizations "front groups" formed by large corporations in which to "hide behind friendly-sounding organizations" in order to mislead the public into trusting their companies and products.  According to the report, IFIC and other front groups run media campaigns which include TV appearances, news articles, advertisements, and published research to present their desired information.

References

International medical and health organizations
Public health organizations
Food safety organizations
Food industry trade groups